Patrick Watson may refer to:
Patrick Watson (musician) (born 1979), Canadian musician, who formed a band by his name
Patrick Watson (producer) (1929–2022), Canadian producer, author, and director
Patrick Heron Watson (1832–1907), Scottish surgeon and pioneer of anaesthetic development